H. L. Bourgeois High School is a public high school in Gray, Louisiana, United States and one of four traditional high schools in the Terrebonne Parish School District. The school is named after Henry Louis Bourgeois, an educator who served as superintendent of the school district from 1914 to 1955. 
Built in response to a rising population at Terrebonne High School, the school opened in 1973 and was first accredited by the Southern Association of Colleges and Schools in 1975. For its first 40 years, HLB primarily served students in grades 10–12. For the 2013–2014 school year, an all-new Freshman Center was completed to serve ninth-grade students. Prior to this, freshman students were housed at nearby Evergreen Junior High School.

The school serves the communities of Gray, Schriever, Gibson, Donner, and Chacahoula, as well as parts of Houma and Thibodaux.

Extracurriculars

Clubs and organizations
HLB also offers students opportunities to participate in clubs and organizations:

4-H
Beta Club
Band
Book Club
Choir
COE
DECA
The Guild
Fishing Club
Insight for Christ
Interact Club
JAG
The Marching Sensation from the Braves' Reservation
Math Club
National Honor Society
The Royal Sensations
Science Club
Student Council
Varsity Quiz Bowl
Drama Club

Athletics
The school is classified as 5A in the Louisiana High School Athletic Association and competes in several sports:

Baseball
Basketball (girls and boys)
Bowling (girls and boys)
Cheerleading (non-sanctioned)
Cross Country (girls and boys)
Football
Golf
Powerlifting (girls and boys)
Raindancers (dance team)
Soccer (girls and boys)
Softball
Swimming (girls and boys)
Tennis (girls and boys)
Track and Field (girls and boys)
Volleyball (girls and boys)

Principals
L. P. Bordelon III (1973–1980)
Luther Fletcher (1980–1994)
Nolan Harris (1994–1997)
Sherry Jones (1997–2004)
Nason Authement (2004–2010)
Bridget Olivier (2010–2013)
Matthew Hodson (2013–2022)
Casannah Moses (2022-present)

Notable alumni
Beryl Amedee (1982), state representative for District 51, based in Houma, since 2016 
"Bubba" (1990), co-host of nationally syndicated radio talk show Big D and Bubba 
LTG Dana K. Chipman (1976), West Point graduate and Judge Advocate General of the US Army
JaJuan Dawson (1995), NFL wide receiver for the Cleveland Browns, Houston Texans, and Indianapolis Colts
Brady Vilcan (1988) and Vicky Vilcan (1987), contestants on the sixth season of the NBC's The Biggest Loser

References

External links
 H. L. Bourgeois High School
 Terrebonne Parish School District

Public high schools in Louisiana
Educational institutions established in 1973
Schools in Terrebonne Parish, Louisiana
1973 establishments in Louisiana